The 1999 WTA Madrid Open doubles was the doubles event of the fourth edition of the Internationaux de Strasbourg, a WTA Tier III tournament held in Madrid, Spain and part of the European clay court season. Florencia Labat and Dominique Van Roost were the defending champions, but they did not compete this year.

Virginia Ruano Pascual and Paola Suárez won the title, defeating Marlene Weingärtner and Labat's and Suárez's compatriot María Fernanda Landa in the final, 6–2, 0–6, 6–0.

Seeds

Draw

Qualifying

Seeds

Qualifiers
  Silvija Talaja /  Dragana Zarić

Qualifying draw

External links
 WTA Madrid Open Doubles Draw
 1999 WTA Madrid Open Doubles Qualifying Draw

Doubles